Halloweens is a side project by The Vaccines members Justin Young and Timothy Lanham. They have released one album, seven singles, and one EP.

Background 
Justin Young and Timothy Lanham teamed up after writing The Vaccines 2018 album Combat Sports together.

Discography

Albums 

 Morning Kiss at the Acropolis (2020)

Singles 

 Hannah, You're Amazing (2019)
 My Baby Looks Good With Another (2020)
 Divinity Pools (2020)
 Lonely Boy Forever (2020)
 Trophies for Pain (Minsky Rock Remix) (2020)
 Brothers in Arms (2020)
 Other Men's Flowers (2022)

EP's 

 Maserati Anxiety Designed (EP, 2020)

References 

Musical groups established in 2018